Texas Scottish Rite Hospital for Children, located in Dallas, is a pediatric hospital specializing in the treatment of orthopedic conditions and sports injuries, as well as certain related arthritic and neurological disorders and learning disorders, such as dyslexia.

Hospital details

Texas Scottish Rite Hospital for Children opened its doors to the children of Texas in 1921. One of Dallas's first orthopedic surgeons, W. B. Carrell, M.D., was approached by a group of Texas Masons who recognized a growing need to provide superior medical care to children suffering from polio regardless of the family's ability to pay. With the introduction of the Salk and Sabin vaccines in the mid-1950s, which virtually eradicated polio in the Western Hemisphere, the hospital broadened its focus to other orthopedic conditions. The hospital was originally called Dallas Scottish Rite Hospital for Crippled Children.

Texas Scottish Rite Hospital for Children treats thousands of children for orthopedic conditions, including scoliosis, club foot, congenital dislocated hip, Legg-Perthes, limb-length differences and hand conditions, as well as children with sports injuries.

The hospital's Sarah M. and Charles E. Seay Center for Musculoskeletal Research supports research at the hospital. Scottish Rite Hospital's research efforts have yielded discoveries such as the TSRH® SILO™ 5.5 Spinal System, TRUE/LOK™ External Fixation System, and the first gene associated with idiopathic scoliosis.

Through the hospital's Luke Waites Center for Dyslexia and Learning Disorders, specific learning disorders, such as dyslexia, are evaluated and treated. The hospital had 36,825 outpatient visits and performed 2,610 surgeries during fiscal year 2016. Physicians hold faculty appointments at UT Southwestern Medical School.

Texas Scottish Rite Hospital for Children is governed by a board of trustees who are members of the Scottish Rite of Freemasonry in Texas. Scottish Rite Masons are affiliated with Freemasonry, a worldwide fraternal organization. Financial support from the Scottish Rite or broader Masonic groups is on an individual basis.

See also 
 Children's Healthcare of Atlanta at Scottish Rite
 Royal Masonic Hospital
 Shriners Children's

References

External links
Texas Scottish Rite Hospital for Children Pediatric Orthopedic Hospital

Children's hospitals in the United States
Hospitals in Dallas
Masonic buildings in Texas
Children's hospitals in Texas